Sheldon John Currie  (born 1934) is a Canadian author, critic and professor emeritus (St. Francis Xavier University). His books include The Glace Bay Miners' Museum, The Company Store and Down the Coaltown Road. A movie, Margaret's Museum, was based on The Glace Bay Miners' Museum. Currie was born in Reserve Mines, Cape Breton as one of five children.

References

1934 births
Living people
Writers from Nova Scotia
Canadian male novelists
Canadian male short story writers
20th-century Canadian dramatists and playwrights
Academic staff of St. Francis Xavier University
Canadian male dramatists and playwrights
20th-century Canadian short story writers
20th-century Canadian novelists
20th-century Canadian male writers
Members of the Order of Canada